Gbadolite is a commune of the city of Gbadolite, the capital of Nord-Ubangi province, Democratic Republic of Congo.  It is located in the rainforest, about a dozen kilometers south of the banks of the Ubangi River.  Gbado, as it is sometimes called, covers 11.2 km 2.  This is one of three communes of the city of Gbadolite.

References 

Nord-Ubangi
Communes of the Democratic Republic of the Congo